Giovanni Giacomo Arigoni also Arrigoni (1597-1675) was an Italian composer in Venice and later organist to Ferdinand II in Vienna.

References

External links

1597 births
1675 deaths
Italian Baroque composers
17th-century Italian composers
Italian male classical composers
17th-century male musicians